Aphareus (4th century BC) was an ancient Greek tragedian and orator. He attended the school of Isocrates, along with Theodectes. He was the son of Hippias the sophist, and the adopted son of Isocrates, left behind him thirty-seven tragedies, and had been successful in winning four victories. None of his works have been found whole.

References

Ancient Greek dramatists and playwrights
Ancient Greek rhetoricians
4th-century BC Greek people
Year of birth unknown
Year of death unknown